This article presents lists of the literary events and publications in 1633.

Events
May 21 – Ben Jonson's masque The King's Entertainment at Welbeck is performed.
October 18 – King Charles I of England reissues the Declaration of Sports, originally published by his father, King James I in 1617, listing sports and recreations permitted on Sundays and holy days.
November 17 – King Charles I of England and Queen Henrietta Maria watch the King's Men perform Shakespeare's Richard III on the Queen's birthday at St James's Palace.
November 26 – The King and Queen watch The Taming of the Shrew at St. James's Palace.
Queen Henrietta's Men have stage success with a revival of Marlowe's The Jew of Malta at the Cockpit Theatre, with new prologues and epilogues by Thomas Heywood and Richard Perkins in the title role. Its first known publication takes place this year in London, as The Famous Tragedy of the Rich Jew of Malta, some forty years after its first performance.
In view of Galileo's condemnation by the Catholic Church, René Descartes abandons plans to publish Treatise on the World, his work of the past four years.

New books

Prose
William Alabaster – Ecce sponsus venit
"Henry van Etten" (pseudonym for Jean Leurechon) – Mathematical Recreations
Fulke Greville – Certain Learned and Elegant Works (containing the closet dramas Alaham and Mustapha)
Thomas James – The Strange and Dangerous Voyage of Captaine Thomas James
Thomas Stafford (ed.) – Pacata Hibernia: Ireland appeased and reduced, or, An historie of the late warres of Ireland, especially within the province of Mounster, under the government of Sir George Carew, knight

Drama
Anonymous – The Costly Whore (published)
Thomas Carew – Coelum Britanicum (masque)
John Fletcher and James Shirley – The Night Walker
John Ford (published in individual editions)
The Broken Heart
Love's Sacrifice
'Tis Pity She's a Whore
Henry Glapthorne – Argalus and Parthenia (approx. date)
Thomas Goffe – Orestes (published)
Peter Hausted (published)
The Rival Friends
Senile Odium
Thomas Heywood – The English Traveller
Ben Jonson – The King's Entertainment at Welbeck
Siddhi Narsingh Malla, King of Nepal – Ekadashi Brata
Christopher Marlowe – The Jew of Malta (published)
Shackerley Marmion – A Fine Companion (published; perhaps first performed)
John Marston – The Workes of Mr. J. Marston (first published collection)
Philip Massinger – A New Way to Pay Old Debts (published)
Walter Mountfort – The Launching of the Mary
Thomas Nabbes – Covent Garden
William Rowley (published)
All's Lost by Lust
A Match at Midnight
James Shirley
The Bird in a Cage (performed and published)
A Contention for Honor and Riches (published)
The Gamester
The Young Admiral
Arthur Wilson – The Inconstant Lady

Poetry
Abraham Cowley – Poetical Blossoms
John Donne (posthumous) – Poems, by J.D., the first collected edition
Phineas Fletcher – The Purple Island, or the Isle of Man
George Herbert (posthumous) – The Temple: Sacred poems and private ejaculations, the first collected edition

Births
February 23 – Samuel Pepys, English diarist (died 1703)
July 1 – Johann Heinrich Heidegger, Swiss theologian (died 1698)
November 11 – George Savile, 1st Marquess of Halifax, English politician and writer (died 1695)

Deaths
March 1 – George Herbert, Welsh-born English poet (born 1593)
August 10 – Anthony Munday, English dramatist and miscellanist (born c. 1560)
September 4 – Lady Margaret Hoby, English diarist (born 1571)
September 27 – Cristóbal de Mesa, Spanish poet (born 1559)
Unknown date – Richard Hawkins, English publisher (year of birth unknown)
Probable year of death – William Bellenden, Scottish classicist (born c. 1550)

References

 
Years of the 17th century in literature